James Ostermann Mason (June 19, 1930 – October 9, 2019) was an American medical doctor and public health administrator. He was the United States Assistant Secretary for Health (ASH) from 1989 to 1993 and the Acting Surgeon General of the United States from 1989 to 1990. As the ASH he was also a former four-star admiral in the United States Public Health Service Commissioned Corps. He was also a director of the Centers for Disease Control and Prevention and a general authority of the Church of Jesus Christ of Latter-day Saints (LDS Church).

Early life and education
Born in Salt Lake City, Utah, Mason earned B.A. and M.D. degrees from the University of Utah. Mason received an MPH from Harvard in 1963. He also earned a DrPH in public health from Harvard University. He completed this later degree at Harvard in 1967.

Mason did residencies at Peter Bent Brigham Hospital and Johns Hopkins Hospital.

Medical career
Mason was the first managing director of the LDS Church's Unified Welfare Services, directing the church's hospital system beginning in 1970 when the church moved general authorities to a position of developing policy and handing over the managing of professional departments to hired professionals. In this position he gave a talk in LDS general conference announcing the health missionary plan in 1971. He continued as head of the church's hospitals until 1975 when the church spun them off as Intermountain Healthcare to allow it to focus health resources more to assist members around the world.

From 1978 to 1979, Mason served as chair of the division of community medicine in the University of Utah's college of medicine.

Mason served as the executive director of the Utah Department of Health from 1979 until 1983, when he was named director of the Centers for Disease Control and Prevention (CDC) in Atlanta, Georgia; Mason held the directorship of the CDC until 1989. In 1993, he was presented with the Gorgas Medal from the Association of Military Surgeons of the United States (AMSUS).

In 1989, the U.S. Senate confirmed Mason as Assistant Secretary for Health, which made him head of the United States Public Health Service, and Acting Surgeon General. He later served as the American delegate to the World Health Organization.

LDS Church service
In 1994, Mason was appointed as a general authority by the LDS Church, serving in the Second Quorum of the Seventy until 2000. From 2000 to 2003, Mason was president of the church's Bountiful Utah Temple.

As a young man, Mason served an LDS Church mission to Denmark. Before his appointment as a general authority, Mason served in the church as a bishop, stake president, and regional representative. In 1974, while serving as Church Commissioner for Health Services, Mason wrote a pamphlet for the church titled, "Attitudes of The Church of Jesus Christ of Latter-day Saints Toward Certain Medical Problems", which expresses the church's views on abortion, birth control, and homosexuality.

Family life
Mason married Marie Smith in 1952 in the Salt Lake Temple and they were the parents of seven children.  Mason died on October 9, 2019.

Notes

References
"Elder James O. Mason of the Seventy", Ensign, May 1994

External links

American general authorities (LDS Church)
American Mormon missionaries in Denmark
Physicians from Utah
Members of the Second Quorum of the Seventy (LDS Church)
Harvard School of Public Health alumni
2019 deaths
Politicians from Salt Lake City
Surgeons General of the United States
University of Utah School of Medicine alumni
LGBT and Mormonism
Regional representatives of the Twelve
State cabinet secretaries of Utah
20th-century Mormon missionaries
1930 births
United States Public Health Service Commissioned Corps admirals
Temple presidents and matrons (LDS Church)
Latter Day Saints from Utah
Latter Day Saints from Georgia (U.S. state)
Latter Day Saints from Massachusetts
Directors of the Centers for Disease Control and Prevention
Reagan administration personnel
George H. W. Bush administration personnel
Recipients of the Public Health Service Distinguished Service Medal
Members of the National Academy of Medicine